Simik Monastery is a Buddhist monastery in Sikkim, northeastern India.

See also 
Buddhism
Gautama Buddha
History of Buddhism in India
Buddhist pilgrimage sites in India

External links 
 Buddhist pilgrimage sites in India
 Pilgrims Guide to Buddhist India: Buddhist Sites

Buddhist monasteries in Sikkim
Tibetan Buddhist monasteries and temples in India